El Español is a Spanish online newspaper which started in 2015. It has its headquarters in Avenida de Burgos, 16D, 7º, Madrid, Comunidad de Madrid.

History
In 2014 Pedro J. Ramírez was dismissed as the director from the newspaper El Mundo, and with his daughter María Ramírez Fernández they founded El Español. The website was opened on 11 January 2015.

On 10 January 2015 it raised € from 5,624 people in two months through crowdfunding. In 10 April it became a Sociedad Anónima, with a share capital of €17 million.

In December 2017, El Español invested in Vandal, a video game website at the time published by Forzáns Inversións SL.

References

External links
 

Spanish-language newspapers
Publications established in 2015
Internet properties established in 2014
Daily newspapers published in Spain